Huckitta is a pallasite meteorite recovered in 1937 from Huckitta Cattle Station in the  Northern Territory of Australia.

History
This mass was called Alice Springs. Over  of iron shale was also found. The Alice Springs meteorite was then paired with the main mass and considered a transported fragment. Today the location of the site where the main mass was found is on Arapunya Cattle Station, which had been part of Huckitta Cattle Station but was excised from it after the meteorite had been recovered.

Composition and classification
It is a pallasite related to Main Group of pallasites. This pallasite is severely weathered: almost all of the metal is highly oxidized and transformed mainly into maghemite and goethite, and the olivine crystals are often altered.
Sometimes it is called an anomalous Main Group pallasite because, compared to other Main Group pallasites, it has rather high Ge and Ga contents, higher Pt, W, Ir, and lower Au content.

Specimens
Main mass, South Australian Museum, Adelaide
, Monnig collection, Fort Worth, Texas
, Arizona State University, Tempe
, Natural History Museum, London
, Max Planck Institute, Mainz
, National Museum of Natural History, Washington, D.C.
, Field Museum of Natural History, Chicago

Notes

See also 
 Glossary of meteoritics
 Meteorite
 Pallasite

External links 
 Madigan's account of the discovery and analysis of the meteorite (PDF)

Meteorites found in Australia
Geology of the Northern Territory